The translucent litter-skink (Lygisaurus macfarlani) is a species of skink found in Queensland in Australia and Papua New Guinea.

The specific name, macfarlani, is in honor of English Missionary Samuel Macfarlane (1837–1911).

References

Lygisaurus
Reptiles described in 1877
Skinks of Australia
Taxa named by Albert Günther